Coleophora agnatella is a moth of the family Coleophoridae. It is found in Spain, Libya and Tunisia.

References

agnatella
Moths described in 1960
Moths of Europe
Moths of Africa